Anisomeles indica, or catmint, is a species of herbaceous plant native to eastern Asia and naturalized on some Pacific islands.

References

indica